Dorothy Sue Cobble (June 28, 1949) is an American historian, and a specialist in the historical study of work, social movements, and feminism in the United States and worldwide. She is currently a Distinguished Professor at Rutgers University, holding dual appointments in the Departments of Labor Studies and History since 1986.

Her book The Other Women’s Movement (2005) coined the term labor feminism.

Early life and education
Cobble grew up in the South, before receiving her B.A. from the University of California, Berkeley in 1972. She worked briefly as a trade union stevedore in the mid-1970s before earning her Ph.D. in history from Stanford University in 1986. A student of Carl Degler, she became a leading historian of women's labor movements.

Career
Cobble's first book Dishing It Out: Waitresses and Their Unions in the Twentieth Century (1991) was among the earliest studies of unionism and the service sector. Her second book, The Other Women's Movement: Workplace Justice and Social Rights in America (2005) is a political and intellectual history of women’s contributions to reforming the workplace. It received the 2005 Philip Taft Book Prize from Cornell University for the best book in American labor history. She edited The Sex of Class: Women Transforming American Labor (2007), published by the Cornell University Press. Most recently she coauthored, with Linda Gordon and Astrid Henry, Feminism Unfinished: A Short, Surprising History of American Women’s Movements (2014).

Publications

Books
 Dishing It Out: Waitresses and Their Unions in the Twentieth Century (1991)
 The Other Women's Movement: Workplace Justice and Social Rights in America (2005)
 The Sex of Class: Women Transforming American Labor (2007)
Feminism Unfinished: A Short, Surprising History of American Women’s Movements with Linda Gordon and Astrid Henry (2014)

Notes

21st-century American historians
Rutgers University faculty
University of California, Berkeley alumni
Stanford University alumni
1949 births
Living people